The 1965 Salisbury by-election was a by-election held for the British House of Commons constituency of Salisbury in Wiltshire on 4 February 1965.  It was won by the Conservative Party candidate Michael Hamilton.

Vacancy 
The seat had become when the 58-year-old sitting Conservative Member of Parliament (MP) John Morrison had been ennobled as Baron Margadale. He had won the seat at a by-election in 1942.

Candidates 
The Conservative candidate was 46-year-old Michael Hamilton.

The Labour Party selected the National Union of Bank Employees official Leif Mills, and the Liberal Party fielded Hugh Capstick; both had contested the seat at the general election in October 1964.  Maj. Horace Trevor-Cox, a former Conservative MP, stood as Independent Conservative candidate.

Result 
Michael Hamilton of the Conservative Party returns to power after he lost his Wellingborough seat in the General election in 1964

Votes

See also
Salisbury (UK Parliament constituency)
Salisbury
1931 Salisbury by-election
1942 Salisbury by-election
List of United Kingdom by-elections

References 

British Parliamentary by-elections: Salisbury 1965

By-elections to the Parliament of the United Kingdom in Wiltshire constituencies
1965 in England
1965 elections in the United Kingdom
Politics of Salisbury
20th century in Wiltshire